Mea culpa is a phrase originating from Latin that means "my fault" or "my mistake" and is an acknowledgement of having done wrong. The expression is used also as an admission of having made a mistake that should have been avoided, and may be accompanied by beating the breast as in its use in a religious context.

The phrase comes from a Western Christian prayer of confession of sinfulness, known as the Confiteor, used in the Roman Rite at the beginning of Mass or when receiving the sacrament of Penance. Grammatically,  is in the ablative case, with an instrumental meaning.

Religious use 
At the sight of the crucifixion of Jesus in the Gospels, "the whole crowd who came together to that sight, seeing what had been done, beat their breasts and returned".In the present form of the Confiteor as used in the celebration of Mass, mea culpa is said three times, the third time with the addition of the adjective maxima ("very great", usually translated as "most grievous"), and is accompanied by the gesture of beating the breast.

According to Adrian Fortescue, the inclusion in the Confiteor of the phrase mea culpa can be traced back only to the 16th century.

However, the Latin phrase mea culpa was used, even in an English context, earlier than that. Geoffrey Chaucer's 14th-century Troilus and Criseyde uses it in a way that shows it was already a traditional religious phrase: "Now, mea culpa, lord! I me repente."

Although the Confiteor was not then part of the Mass, it was used in administering the sacrament of Penance. In some forms it already included the phrase mea culpa. Thus the 9th-century Paenitentiale Vallicellanum II had a thrice-repeated mea culpa (without maxima) in its elaborate form of the Confiteor.

In about 1220, the rite of public penance in Siena for those who had committed murder required the penitent to throw himself on the ground three times, saying: Mea culpa; peccavi; Domine miserere mei'' ("Through my fault. I have sinned. Lord, have mercy on me").

See also

 List of ecclesiastical abbreviations
 List of Latin phrases
 Self-criticism

References

External links

Sancta Missa – Prayers at the Foot of the Altar , Latin and English, sanctamissa.org

Latin religious words and phrases